The 2000–01 Mid-American Conference men's basketball season began with practices in October 2000, followed by the start of the 2000–01 NCAA Division I men's basketball season in November. Conference play began in January 2001 and concluded in March 2001. Central Michigan won the regular season title with a conference record of 14–4 by one game over second-place Kent State. Kent State defeated Miami in the MAC tournament final and represented the MAC in the NCAA tournament. There they defeated Indiana before losing to Cincinnati.

Preseason awards
The preseason poll was announced by the league office on October 4, 2000.

Preseason men's basketball poll
(First place votes in parenthesis)

East Division
  (29) 265 
  (11) 229 
  174
  165
 Ohio 144
  100
  43

West Division
  (20) 219
  (19) 213
  (1) 133
 Eastern Michigan 122
  79
  74

Tournament champs
Marshall (14), Ball State (10), Kent State (7), Toledo (6), Bowling Green (1), Miami (1), Central Michigan (1)

Honors

Postseason

Mid–American Tournament

NCAA tournament

Postseason awards

Coach of the Year: Jay Smith, Central Michigan
Player of the Year: David Webber, Central Michigan
Freshman of the Year: Terry Reynolds, Toledo
Defensive Player of the Year: Demetric Shaw, Kent State

Honors

References